Ala is a village in Hiiumaa Parish, Hiiu County in northwestern Estonia.

The village is first mentioned in 1798 (Alla).

1977-1997 the village was part of Palade. 1997-1998 the village bore the name Alaküla.

References

Villages in Hiiu County